Gordon McChesney "Ches" Smith is an American musician, whose primary instruments are drums, percussion, and vibraphone.

He recorded and performed an album of his own solo percussion pieces entitled Congs for Brums (2006). In 2010 he released Noise to Men.

Discography

As leader/co-leader
2006 – Congs for Brums (Free Porcupine Society)
2010 – Noise to Men (Self Released)
2010 – Finally Out of My Hands (Skirl)
2012 – Psycho Predictions (88)
2013 – Hammered (Clean Feed)
2014 – International Hoohah (ForTune)
2016 – The Bell (ECM)
2018 – A Complete and Tonal Disaster (Self Released)
2021 – Path of Seven Colors (Pyroclastic)
2022 – Interpret It Well (Pyroclastic)

As sideman
with Tim Berne
2012 – Snakeoil (ECM)
2013 – Shadow Man (ECM)
2015 – You've Been Watching Me (ECM)
2015 – Spare (Screwgun)
2017 – Incidentals (ECM)
2020 – The Fantastic Mrs. 10 (Intakt)
2020 – The Deceptive 4 (Live) (Intakt)
2022 - Decay (Screwgun)

with Trevor Dunn's trio-convulsant
2004 – Sister Phantom Owl Fish (Ipecac)

with Moe! Staiano
2001 – The Lateness of Yearly Presentations

with Moe! Staiano's Moe!kestra!
2006 – An Inescapable Siren Within Earshot Distance Therein and Other Whereabouts
2007 – Two Rooms of Uranium Inside 83 Markers

with Graham Connah
2001 – The Only Song We Know

with Good For Cows
2001 – Good for Cows
2003 – Cows Less Than or Equal To
2004 – Bebop Fantasy
2008 – 10th Concert Anniversary
2010 – Audumla

with Theory Of Ruin
2002 – Counter–Culture Nosebleed
2003 – Frontline Posterchild

with Mitch Marcus Quintet
2002 – Entropious

with Lou Harrison
2003 – Drums Along the Pacific

with John Zorn
2003 – Voices in the Wilderness (Tzadik)
2016 – The Painted Bird (Tzadik)
2018 – The Urmuz Epigrams (Tzadik)
2018 – In a Convex Mirror (Tzadik)
2020 – Les Maudits (Tzadik)
2021 – Heaven and Earth Magick (Tzadik)
2022 – Incerto (Tzadik)
2022 – Suite For Piano (Tzadik)

with Xiu Xiu
2002 – Knife Play with Greg Saunier
2003 – A Promise
2005 – La Foret
2007 – Remixed and Covered as Good for Cows
2008 – Women as Lovers
2010 – Dear God I Hate Myself
2012 – Always
2013 – Nina

with David Torn
2019 – Sun Of Goldfinger (ECM)
2020 – Sun Of Goldfinger (Congratulations to You) (Screwgun)
2022 - Ozmir (Screwgun)

with Secret Chiefs 3
2004 – Book of Horizons
2008 – Xaphan: Book of Angels Volume 9
2013 – Book Of Souls: Folio A
2019 – The Book Beri'ah Vol 10—Malkhut

with Aaron Novik
2004 – Gubbish: Notations in Tonations
2006 – Kipple: Flashes of Irrational Happiness

with Redressers
2004 – To Each According...

with Carla Bozulich/Evangelista
2009 – Prince of Truth
2011 – In Animal Tongue
2014 – I'm Gonna Stop Killing

with Will Bernard Trio
2005 – Directions to My House

with Fever Pitch
2005 – Just Drums 2 Project

with Sean Hayes
2006 – Big Black Hole and the Little Baby Star

with Todd Sickafoose
2006 – Blood Orange

with Ben Goldberg Quintet
2006 – The Door, the Hat, the Chair, the Fact

with 7 Year Rabbit Cycle
2006 – Ache Horns

with Fred Frith, Darren Johnston, Devin Hoff and Larry Ochs
2007 – Reason to Move

with Marc Ribot's Ceramic Dog
2008 – Party Intellectuals
2013 – Your Turn
2018 – YRU Still Here?

with Leonid Fedorov, Vladimir Volkov, John Medeski, Marc Ribot
2010 – RazinRimILev

with Dave Holland
2018 – Uncharted Territories

with Moonface
2018 – This One's for the Dancer & This One's for the Dancer's Bouquet

References

External links
Ches Smith homepage
Ches Smith on DAZ.com

Picture gallery at downtownmusic.net

American rock drummers
American jazz drummers
American percussionists
American vibraphonists
Living people
Year of birth missing (living people)
Trevor Dunn's Trio-Convulsant members